Selden may refer to:

Places
In the United States:
Fort Selden, in New Mexico 
Selden, Kansas
Selden, New York

In Switzerland:
Selden (Kandersteg)

Other uses
Selden (surname)
Selden, character from Conan Doyle's The Hound of the Baskervilles
Selden Motor Vehicle Company, an early automobile manufacturer

See also
Seldon (disambiguation)
Justice Selden (disambiguation)